Mahdia is the capital of the Potaro-Siparuni region of Guyana, located near the centre of the country at an altitude of .

Commerce is centred on the area's gold and diamond mining operations. As such it is affected by the economic booms and busts and attracts immigrants, both local and foreign, to obtain wealth through mining.

Demographics
The population in Mahdia as of 2012 was 2,563 people, and is of three groups.  The Patamonas, an indigenous Amerindian tribe, are involved in farming, hunting and mining. The Coast Landers, residents from the coastlands of Guyana,  migrated to the hinterland to seek employment mainly mining.  The third group, called Islanders, are immigrants, and their descendants are from the Caribbean Islands, particularly, St Lucia and Dominica. They  focus on farming and burning charcoal.  Within recent times, there has been an influx of a new group, the Brazilians, who are also involved in mining and other businesses.
On 10 September annually, the Amerindians celebrate Heritage Month in the community of Campbelltown, Mahdia, while the Islanders celebrate the La Rose Festival at the end of August. This festival was originated in St Lucia.
Mahdia being the Regional Administrative Centre of Region 8, Potaro-Siparuni has the following relevant infrastructure:
 	A cottage hospital
 	A nursery, primary and a secondary school
 	A commercial sector which includes dry goods, boutiques, a fuel station and 11 restaurants.
       Four hotels; two guest houses and four brothels
       A police station
 	A post office
 	Two artisan wells	
       A Regional Administrative Office
       A airstrip
Residents still depend on rainfall and water from the Salbora Falls. While electricity is currently provided by  local businessmen.

History
Mahdia was established in 1884, by the Africans after their emancipation. Most of them travelled from the county of Berbice and the East Coast of Demerara in search of gold. The British Consolidated Mining Company, expanded the mining exploration in Mahdia and established, Colonial Administrative offices. During this period Mahdia was only accessible by waterways.

Gold mining attracted a number of St. Lucians to Mahdia, bringing with them the French Patois (Kweol) language and cultural traditions such as La Rose celebration.

In November 1933 a bridge was constructed over the Garraway Stream, linking Mahdia to Bartica by trail. This bridge which is suspended by cables was named the Denham Suspension Bridge, after the then Colonial Governor Sir Edward Denham. It is still in use today and has become a tourist site. In 2018, Mahdia received a town status

Mining
There are one hundred and fifty (150) land dredges in the mining district of Mahdia. Most miners use excavators to extract the overburden and utilize gravel pumps to extract the gravel with gold from the pits. On most occasions the pits are not refilled which causes the anopheles mosquito to breed and so increase the spread of malaria. Recently the Guyana Geology and Mines Commission has embarked upon reinforcing the amendment regulations, 2005, for environmental management, which has instantly created an impact in the community, by curbing the pollution of water ways and encouraged soil reclamation and replanting trees in areas where there has been deforestation.

Climate
Mahdia has a tropical rainforest climate (Af) with heavy to very heavy  rainfall year-round.

Gallery

References

Daly, V.T.  The Making of Guyana. 1974.
Fernandes, L.L.  Report  May – December, 1974,  Mcdame Exploration Ltd.
Woolford William. Booklet For Guyana Geology And Mines Commission, March 2008.

Populated places in Potaro-Siparuni
Cottage hospitals